Jan Juroška (born 2 March 1993) is a professional Czech football player who currently plays for Baník Ostrava. He scored on his Czech First League debut for the Dukla Prague, a 3–2 loss to Bohemians 1905, after joining the game as a second-half substitute in May 2014. In May 2017 he signed a three-year contract with Dukla's First League rivals, 1. FC Slovácko.

Career statistics

References

External links
 

Czech footballers
1993 births
Living people
Czech First League players
FK Dukla Prague players
FK Varnsdorf players
FC Silon Táborsko players
1. FC Slovácko players
Association football defenders
FC Baník Ostrava players